Dangerous Waters is a 1936 American adventure film directed by Lambert Hillyer and written by Richard Schayer, Hazel Jamieson and Malcolm Stuart Boylan. The film stars Jack Holt, Robert Armstrong, Grace Bradley, Diana Gibson, Charles Murray and Willard Robertson. The film was released on February 10, 1936, by Universal Pictures.

Plot

Cast  
Jack Holt as Jim Marlowe
Robert Armstrong as 'Dusty' Johnson
Grace Bradley as Joan Marlowe
Diana Gibson as Ruth Denning
Charles Murray as Chief Engineer McDuffy 
Willard Robertson as Bill MacKeechie
Guy Usher as Captain Denning
Dewey Robinson as Chips
Edward Gargan as Bosun 
Edwin Maxwell as Mr. Brunch
Richard Alexander as Hays
Walter Miller as Oleson
Donald Briggs as Quartermaster 
John 'Dusty' King as Singing Sailor

References

External links
 

1936 films
American adventure films
1936 adventure films
Universal Pictures films
Films directed by Lambert Hillyer
American black-and-white films
Films about the United States Coast Guard
1930s English-language films
1930s American films
Films with screenplays by Richard Schayer
English-language adventure films